Assyrian National Broadcasting (ANB Sat), was a private television broadcasting company for the Assyrian community, available for viewing on the internet or through satellite. ANB Sat was founded in 2011 by Ninos Ternian in order to preserve and extend the reach of Assyrian heritage, culture, and language.

See also

 Ashur TV
 Assyria TV
 Ishtar TV
 Suroyo TV
 Suryoyo Sat
 KBSV

External links 
 Assyrian National Broadcasting website

Aramaic-language television channels
Television channels and stations established in 2011
2011 establishments in California